"Untouchable" is a song by American rapper Eminem, released on December 8, 2017. It is the fourth track from his ninth solo studio album Revival (2017). The song was produced by Mr. Porter, Emile Haynie, Mark Batson and Eminem. An audio video was uploaded to Eminem's Vevo channel on December 8, 2017. On February 15, 2018, a lyric video was uploaded to his Vevo channel.

Background
Eminem stated on his website that he was going to release a new track on December 8. This led to the promotional single "Untouchable". The song features a sample from the song "Earache My Eye" by the comedy duo Cheech & Chong. The song is a heavily political song which mentions police brutality and institutional racism in the United States. Marshall met Masta Ace a long time ago before song was made according to DJMasterCee. The disc jockey said that Eminem got permission from Ace to use his lines on the Revival track and compared Mathers to Elvis in Hip Hop .

Charts

References

Songs about police officers
2017 singles
2017 songs
Eminem songs
Songs written by Eminem
Song recordings produced by Eminem
Song recordings produced by Emile Haynie
Songs against racism and xenophobia
Criticism of police brutality
Songs about police brutality

Rap rock songs